The 2013–14 Harvard Crimson men's basketball team represented Harvard University during the 2013–14 NCAA Division I men's basketball season. The Crimson, led by seventh year head coach Tommy Amaker, played their home games at Lavietes Pavilion and were members of the Ivy League. They finished the season 27–5, 13–1 in Ivy League play to win the Ivy League championship and earn the conference's automatic bid to the NCAA tournament. In the NCAA Tournament, as a 12-seed, the Crimson upset 5-seed Cincinnati in the first round before losing in the second round to 4-seed Michigan State.

Preseason
On September 27, USA Today Scott Gleeson named Harvard the 31st best team in the country and projected the team to earn a number 8 seed in the 2014 NCAA Division I men's basketball tournament. When the preseason Coaches' Poll was released on October 17, three-time Ivy League defending champion Harvard received 28 points (the 32nd highest point total). When the preseason Associated Press poll was released, Harvard had 46 points (the 31st highest total). Sports Illustrated listed Harvard 20th in its College Basketball edition. Its support was largely based upon the return of 2013 Ivy Rookie of the Year Siyani Chambers and the 2013 Ivy League scoring champion Wesley Saunders as well as the return of Kyle Casey and Brandyn Curry, who had redshirtted the previous season due to the 2012 Harvard cheating scandal. Casey and Curry had been 2011–12 All-Ivy League first and second team selections, respectively.

Harvard was the unanimous selection of the 17-member Ivy League media poll selection committee when it was released on October 23, 2013. Harvard was also the preseason selection of Athlon Sports, Blue Ribbon College Basketball Yearbook, Lindy's Sports and NBCSports.com, but Sporting News selected them second to Princeton. Saunders was selected as the preseason Ivy League player of the year according to Athlon Sports, Blue Ribbon College Basketball Yearbook, Lindy's Sports, NBCSports.com and Sporting News and was a CollegeInsider.Com
Lou Henson Preseason Mid-Major All-America Team selection. Both Curry and Chambers were preseason Bob Cousy Award watchlist selections. The team selected Casey and Curry to be its co-captains.

Recruits

Class of 2013
Zena Edosomwan was a 4-star recruit and among the top 100 players in the class of 2012 according to multiple recruiting services. Harvard's recruitment of him has become controversial because he had substandard academic qualifications for Harvard. He had to take the SAT's multiple times and reclassify into the class of 2013 while pursuing a post-graduate year at Northfield Mount Hermon. Edosomwan declined basketball scholarships from UCLA, USC, California, Texas, Wake Forest, Arizona, Arizona State, Colorado, Gonzaga, Notre Dame, San Francisco, Texas, Vanderbilt, and Washington to attend Harvard. He is the first player rated among the top 100 by Scout.com to ever commit to Harvard.

Class of 2014
On September 29, 2013 4-star recruit Chris Egi and 3-star recruit Andre Chatfield both made verbal commitments to Harvard. Egi is the second top 100 recruit in two years for Harvard.

Roster

Schedule
Harvard opened its season on November 10 with a victory over in-state Greater Boston rival Holy Cross at the TD Garden. They then defeated Cambridge rival  on November 12 in the home opener at Lavietes Pavilion. After scoring 14 points and adding 6 assists, 4 rebounds, 3 steals and 2 blocks while playing 37 minutes in the first game of the season, Curry missed the next three games due to a foot injury. After starting the season 4–0, the team lost its first game on the road against Pac-12 Conference Colorado on November 24. Curry re-aggravated his foot against Colorado and was described as out indefinitely by Amaker. In the 2013 Great Alaska Shootout, Harvard defeated Denver, Green Bay and TCU to win the November 27–30 tournament.

|-
!colspan=9 style="background:#991111; color:#FFFFFF;"| Regular season

|-
!colspan=9 style="background:#991111; color:#FFFFFF;"| NCAA tournament

Honors
On March 11 Saunders was named to the District I (ME, VT, NH, RI, MA, CT) team by the United States Basketball Writers Association (USBWA).  Saunders was listed on The National Association of Basketball Coaches Division I All‐District 13 first team on March 12.

Rankings

References

Harvard Crimson men's basketball seasons
Harvard
Harvard
Harvard Crimson men's basketball
Harvard Crimson men's basketball
Harvard Crimson men's basketball
Harvard Crimson men's basketball